Cats, like all living organisms, occasionally have mutations that affect their body type. Sometimes, these mutations are striking enough that humans select for and perpetuate them. This is not always in the best interests of the cat, as many of these mutations are harmful; some are even lethal in their homozygous form.

This article gives a selection of cat body type mutant alleles and the associated mutations with a brief description.

Tail types 
 Jb Japanese Bobtail gene (autosomal dominant). Cats homozygous and heterozygous for this gene display shortened and kinked tails. Cats homozygous for the gene tend to have shorter, more kinked tails.  This can be distinguished phenotypically from the Manx cat mutation by the presence of kinking in the tail, often forming what looks like a knot at the distal end of the tail.  Unlike the Manx tailless gene, there are no associated skeletal disorders and the gene is not associated with lethality.
 M Manx tailless gene (dominant with high penetrance). Cats with the homozygous genotype (MM) die before birth, and stillborn kittens show gross abnormalities of the central nervous system. Cats with the heterozygous genotype (Mm) show severely shortened tail length, ranging from taillessness to a partial, stumpy tail. Some Manx cats die before 12 months old and exhibit skeletal and organ defects. Because it was discovered in naturally occurring populations of cats, the Manx gene could confer some kind of selective advantage to the cats, or it may simply be an example of the founder effect. The trait also occurred and died out in Cornwall (peninsular England), but persisted in the Isle of Man population where outbreeding was not frequent due to isolation. Shortened tails, most of which are indistinguishable from the Japanese Bobtail or the variably expressed Manx mutation, may occur sporadically in any cat breed or mixed-breed population. However, some may be novel mutations that have not been investigated. There are multiple types of curly-tailed cats whose tails loop over the back or form tight corkscrews. One such mutation has been developed into the American Ringtail, but others have been regarded as curiosities and not perpetuated. The gene(s) responsible have not been fully investigated. However, a research study is under way at UC Davis under the guidance of Leslie A. Lyons, currently at the University of Missouri.

Limbs 

 Mk Munchkin gene (dominant). Cats heterozygous for this gene (Mkmk) have shortened legs, but are not disabled. They have a ferret-like gait. The homozygous form (MkMk) may be lethal as litter sizes are smaller than average. Although there was initial concern that Munchkin-type cats would have impaired mobility or spinal problems, this was based on comparison with dog breeds and proved to be unfounded due to the cat's more flexible spine. The mutation has occurred naturally in many locations and has also been perpetuated in feral cats without human intervention (Robinson 1999).  This gene is the basis for several intentionally selected breeds of dwarf cat. The mutation has proven not to be achondroplasia, but is most likely to be either hypochondroplasia or pseudochondroplasia, which affect the long bones of the leg while leaving other bodily proportions, especially the head, unchanged.

Paws 

 Sh Split Foot (Syndactyly). A dominant gene that reduces the number of toes resulting in a "lobster-claw" appearance. This is considered an undesirable mutation.: Polydactyly: There are probably many genes, both dominant and recessive, that cause polydactyly in cats. Most cases of polydactyly in cats are perfectly harmless.
 Pd Thumb-cat polydactyly gene. The Pd gene (dominant with incomplete penetrance) causes the benign, pre-axial form of polydactyly where one or more extra toes occur near the dew claw. Often, the dew claw is converted into a thumb. There are occasional problems, such as fused claws or claws facing in the wrong direction, but, generally, this form of polydactyly is harmless. On the other hand, the "hamburger-feet" polydactyly gene is associated with the gene for radial hypoplasia (RH). The European Convention for the Protection of Pet Animals discourages deliberate breeding of these cats for two reasons, first that it falls under hypertyping (intentional breeding of extreme characteristics), and secondly that the position of the legs are abnormal. In a scandal in the late 1990s, an experimental breeder in Texas tried to perpetuate this deformity as the "Twisty Cat" breed. Mild RH can cause the post-axial form of polydactyly – enlarged paws, extra three-jointed toes on the outer, little-toe side of the paws, and no thumb. X-rays can determine the structure of the extra toes and whether the cat has the gene for RH. Cats with the gene for RH should never be bred. Cats with severe RH have unusually short front legs. They move like a ferret and they tend to sit like a squirrel or kangaroo and are colloquially known as squittens. In some RH cats, the forelegs are twisted with the long bones either severely shortened or absent. All polydactyl cats are banned from German cat shows, possibly because of confusion with the impairing form of polydactyly associated with RH. Polydactyl cats are relatively common in southwest Britain, Norway, Sweden, and the eastern coast of the United States and Canada, and some parts of Asia. Sailors thought they were lucky. Various folktales and dubious assumptions about polydactyl cats include that they are superior rodent hunters, that they have better balance on ships in stormy weather, that their paws are natural snowshoes, and that the opposable thumbs (in the thumb-cat form of polydactyly) give them a survival advantage. Ernest Hemingway collected polydactyl cats, and the descendants of his pets may still be found at the Ernest Hemingway House in Key West.

Ear types 

 Cu American Curl gene (dominant). Cats with this gene have ears that start out normal, but gradually curl backwards. So far, no major harmful defects have been associated with this gene, however, due to the more exposed inner ear regular cleaning is required to prevent infection. Curled ears have also been observed in free-roaming cats in the Greek islands and in a cat in Australia.
 Fd Scottish Fold gene (dominant with incomplete penetrance). Cats with this gene have ears that curl forward. There are different degrees of folding, and more genes may be involved in the expression of the Fd gene. This gene is associated with bone and cartilage defects such as thickened tail and swollen feet. The homozygous form (FdFd) causes severe osteochondrodysplasia. Because of this, many breeders only breed folds to non-folds to avoid homozygous folds. However, heterozygous folds may also develop osteochondrodysplasia of lesser severity.
 Australian Curl a curl-eared mutation occurred in a female stray cat in Australia, but was not inherited by her offspring. When the original cat became ill, necessitating spaying, it was impossible to test-mate her sons back to her to identify a possibly recessive curled-ear mutation. 
 Sumxu or Chinese Lop-Eared Cat extinct Chinese Lop-eared cat breed reported between 1700 and 1938 around Peking, most descriptions are based on a specimen in a German museum. The mode of inheritance of its pendulous ears is not known (the name Sumxu results from mistranslations and actually refers to a variety of marten).
 Four ears a recessive mutation that produced four pinnae or ear flaps (the additional pinnae did not lead to additional ear canals and organs of hearing). In a group of four-eared cats studied in 1957, in addition to duplicated ears, the eyes were reduced in size, the jaw was slightly undershot and the cats were relatively inactive and lethargic. Researchers believed that the functioning of the brain was affected. Breeding data indicated it was most often lethal with kittens dying in utero. The majority of recently reported four-eared cats have been healthy with various ear configurations suggesting other genes were involved or developmental abnormalities rather than hereditary factors.
 Rounded ears a rounded ears mutation occurred in a cat in Italy and is being assessed for breed potential. A similar mutation occurred among free-roaming cats in Texas, but died out. The ears have a rounded, rather than pointed, shape.

Fur
The Sphynx cat is a breed of cat known for its lack of fur. Hairlessness in cats is a naturally occurring genetic mutation and the Sphynx was developed through selective breeding starting in the 1960s.

Size 

A germ-cell mutation occurred in a male Persian cat called Treker in 1995, resulting in diminutive, but healthy and normally-proportioned, offspring. Treker and the females with which he was mated were normally sized, but 75% of the kittens sired by Treker inherited diminutive stature, but of normal proportions. The gene was found to be dominant and the diminutive offspring were sold as teacup or toy Persians. Teacup/Toy Persians are a separate breed and not all cats advertised under those names result from Treker's dominant mutation. Most teacup and toy size Persian kittens raised now are descendants from Silver and Golden color division to reduce cat size and are in no way related to Treker.

References

Further reading 

 Robinson, Roy. "Genetics for Cat Breeders and Veterinarians" Butterworth Heinemann 1999. 
 Journal of Heredity
 Cat genetics
 Dwarf Cats - Purebred
 Cat Gene Loci

 
Mutation
Evolution of mammals